Raouf Lahcen (born 10 July 1981) is an Algerian professional footballer. He currently plays as a defender for the Algerian Ligue 2 club Olympique de Médéa.

References

External links

1981 births
Living people
Algerian footballers
Olympique de Médéa players
Algerian Ligue 2 players
MC Saïda players
USM Annaba players
Footballers from Algiers
Association football defenders
21st-century Algerian people